Ingeborg Bronsart von Schellendorf (born Ingeborg Maria Wilhelmina Starck, 24 August 1840 in Saint Petersburg, died 17 June 1913 in Munich) was a Finnish-German composer.

Life
Ingeborg Starck was the daughter of Finnish parents Margareta Åkerman and Otto Starck (originally Tarkiain[en]) who were living in Saint Petersburg, Russia, where her father, a court saddle-maker, was involved in commerce. Her native language was Finland's Swedish. Having shown musical gifts from a young age, she studied piano with Nicolas von Martinoff and Adolf Henselt, as well as composition with Constantin Decker. She completed her studies in Weimar with Franz Liszt. During a stay in Paris in 1861 her friends included composers such as Auber, Berlioz, Rossini and Wagner (who commented in his autobiography on her good looks). In September of the same year, she married fellow pianist-composer Hans Bronsart von Schellendorff, a member of Liszt's circle whom she had met in Weimar.

Ingeborg Bronsart von Schellendorf, as she was now known, toured Europe as a concert pianist until 1867, when she was expected to cease work due to her husband's appointment as general manager of the Royal Theatre in Hanover. She remained musically active, however, as a composer of opera, chamber and instrumental music and a large number of songs. Earlier, she had composed a piano concerto (1863), now lost. During her lifetime her operas were successfully produced in many theatres in Germany. Pieces composed by her which were popular at the time included her Kaiser Wilhelm March (1871), the Singspiel Jery und Bätely (1873) and the opera Hiarne (1891).

Works

Operas
 Die Göttin von Sais (1867)
 Jery und Bätely (1873)
 König Hiarne (1891)
 Die Sühne (1909)

Concertos
 Concerto for Piano and Orchestra in F-minor (1863)

Orchestral works
 Kaiser Wilhelm March (1872)

Chamber music
 Romanze in A minor for violin and piano (1873)
 Notturno in A minor for cello and piano, op. 13 (1879)
 Elegie in C major for cello and piano, op. 14 (1879)
 Romanze in B-flat major for cello and piano, op. 15 (1879)
 Phantasie for violin and piano, op. 21 (1891)

Piano music 
 Trois études (1855)
 Nocturne (1855)
 Tarantella (1855)
 Fuge über die Namen Maria und Martha (von Sabinin) (1859)
 Fugues (1859)
 Variations on themes by Bach (1859)
 Variations (1859)
 Toccatas (1859)
 Sonata (1859)
 Kaiser Wilhelm March (1871)
 Vier Clavierstücke (1874)
 Drei Phantasie in G-sharp minor, op. 18 (1891)

Choral music 
 Hurrah Germania! for male choir (1871)
 Kennst du die rothe Rose? for soloists male choir and mixed choir (1873)
 Easter Lied, for choir, op 27 (1903)

Songs
 Die Loreley (1865)
(Text: Heinrich Heine)
 Und ob der holde Tag vergangen (1870)
 Three Lieder  (1871) 
(Texts: A. Dunker, E. Neubauer, H. Zeise)
 Three Lieder (1872) 
(Texts: Heine, O. Roquette)
... 3. Ich hab' im Traum geweinet
 Five Lieder (1878) 
(Texts: Johann Wolfgang von Goethe, August von Platen, Friedrich Rückert)  
 Six Lieder by Mirza Schaffy, op 8 (1879) 
(Texts: Friedrich Martin von Bodenstedt after Mirza Shafi Vazeh) 
1. Zuléikha;  2. Im Garten klagt die Nachtigall; 3. Wenn der Frühling auf die Berge steigt; 4. Gelb rollt mir zu Füßen; 5. Die helle Sonne leuchtet; 6. Ich fühle deinen Odem
 Hafisa: Three Lieder by Mirza Schaffy, op 9 (1879)
(Texts: Bodenstedt after Mirza Shafi)
 6 Poems, op 10 (1879)
(Texts: Bodenstedt)
1. Mir träumte einst ein schöner Traum; 2. Abschied vom Kaukasus; 3.  Wie lächeln die Augen; 4.  Nachtigall, o Nachtigall; 5. Das Vöglein; 6. Sing, mit Sonnenaufgang singe
 Five Christmas Lieder, op 11 (1880)
(Texts: Jakobi)
 Five Poems, op 12 (1880)
(Texts: Bodenstedt)
 Röslein auf Haiden (1880–1885)
(Text: Richard Voss)
 Five Poems, op. 16 (1882)
(Texts: Ernst von Wildenbruch)
1. Abendlied; 2. Ständchen; 3. Zwei Sträusse; 4. Der Blumenstrauss 5. Letzte Bitte
 Twelve Nursery Rhymes, op 17 (1882)
 (Texts: Klaus Groth)
 Wie dich die warme Luft umscherzt“ (?)
 Blumengruss (1888)
 (Text: Goethe)
 Six Poems, op 20 (1891)
 (Texts: Michail Lermontov) 
 Three Poems, op 22 (1891)
 (Texts: Peter Cornelius) 
 Three Lieder, op 23 (1892)
 (Texts: Goethe, Nikolaus Lenau, Platen)
 Im Lenz (1898)
 (Text: Paul Heyse)
 Rappelle-toi! op. 24 (1902) 
 (Text: Alfred de Musset) 
 Three Lieder, op. 25 (1902)
 (Texts: Bodenstedt, Goethe, Heine)
 ... 3. Ich stand in dunkeln Träumen (Heine)
 Abschied, op. 26 (1902)
 (Text: Felix Dahn)
 Lieder, (c. 1903)
 (Texts: Bodenstedt)
 Verwandlung (1910)
 (Text: Paul Heyse)
 Lieder (1910)

References

Sources
 This article is based on the Swedish Wikipedia entry
 The list of songs is drawn from the Lied and Art Song Texts Page and a list of works by MUGi – Musik und Gender im Internet

External links

Biographical sketch and list of works (in German) by Katharina Hottmann at MUGi – Musik und Gender im Internet, Hochschule für Musik und Theater Hamburg

1840 births
1913 deaths
19th-century classical composers
19th-century German composers
19th-century women composers
19th-century classical pianists
20th-century classical composers
20th-century German composers
20th-century women composers
German women classical composers
German opera composers
German classical pianists
German women pianists
Finnish classical composers
Finnish classical pianists
Finnish women pianists
Women classical composers
Women opera composers
Women classical pianists
Musicians from Saint Petersburg
Pupils of Adolf Henselt
Finnish people from the Russian Empire
German people of Finnish descent
Swedish-speaking Finns
20th-century German women
20th-century Finnish composers
19th-century women pianists
20th-century women pianists